Piaf is a 1974 French musical biographical film directed by Guy Casaril and starring Brigitte Ariel, Pascale Christophe and Guy Tréjan. It is based on the early career of the singer Edith Piaf.

The film's sets were designed by the art director François de Lamothe.

Cast
 Brigitte Ariel as Edith Gassion, dite Edith Piaf
 Pascale Christophe as Momone
 Guy Tréjan as Louis Leplée
 Pierre Vernier as Raymond Asso
 Jacques Duby as Julien
 Anouk Ferjac as Madeleine
 Sylvie Joly as Lulu
 Yvan Varco as Félix
 Michel Bedetti as Constantini
 François Dyrek as Henri

References

Bibliography 
 Richard B. Armstrong & Mary Willems Armstrong. Encyclopedia of Film Themes, Settings and Series. McFarland, 2009.
 David Looseley. Édith Piaf: A Cultural History. Oxford University Press, 2016.

External links 
 

1974 films
French biographical drama films
1974 drama films
1970s French-language films
French black-and-white films
Films directed by Guy Casaril
Films set in Paris
Cultural depictions of Édith Piaf
1940s French films
1970s French films